Coming Home is a 2014 Chinese historical drama film directed by Zhang Yimou and starring Chen Daoming and Gong Li. It was released in the US on September 11, 2015, and first shown to the public on the May 20, 2014, at the Cannes Film Festival. The story is adapted from the novel The Criminal Lu Yanshi written by novelist Geling Yan.

Plot
Lu Yanshi was a professor before being sent to the labor camp during the Cultural Revolution. He escapes from the labor camp in Xining to meet his long-missed wife Feng Wanyu and daughter Dandan. However, the police were already waiting outside the house to arrest him.

Dandan, a teenage ballerina, could not play the leading role in Red Detachment of Women due to her father's outlaw status. Under the temptation of regaining the leading role, Dandan reveals her parents' secret meeting plan to the police. The meeting ends with the capture of Lu, but Dandan still does not get the leading role.

After the end of the Cultural Revolution, Lu comes home only to find his family broken- his wife suffering from amnesia and his daughter working as a textile worker. Under the shock of a former official's sexual harassment, his wife sometimes mistakes Lu as Officer Fang instead of her husband.  To reawaken his wife's memory, Lu disguises himself as a stranger so he can be near his wife. She recognizes him only as a letter reader or a piano tuner, and he never could live close enough with his chaste wife because of her trauma. During these years, Lu continued to write to his wife as a way of communicating with her and to convince her to forgive their daughter.

Several years later Feng is waiting to receive her husband outside the railway station on a snowy day, and Lu is standing with her, pretending to be a pedicab driver.

Cast
Chen Daoming as Lu Yanshi
Gong Li as Feng Wanyu, Lu Yanshi's wife
Zhang Huiwen as Dandan, Yanshi and Wanyu's daughter
Guo Tao
Liu Peiqi
Zu Feng
Yan Ni
Xin Baiqing
Zhang Jiayi
Chen Xiaoyi
Ding Jiali

Production
The film was shot in Tianjin and Beijing.

Releases
Coming Home had its international premiere at the 2014 Cannes Film Festival in the out of competition section. It was scheduled to be screened in the Special Presentations section of the 2014 Toronto International Film Festival.

Reception

Critical reception
On Rotten Tomatoes, the film has a rating of 89% based on 80 reviews, with an average rating of 7.6/10. The website's critics consensus reads: "The rare tearjerking melodrama with sociopolitical subtext, Coming Home plucks the heartstrings with thought-provoking power." According to Metacritic, which sampled 21 critics and calculated a weighted average score of 81 out of 100, the film received "universal acclaim".

Box office
The film grossed ¥23.7 million (US$3.80 million) on the first day in China and reached US$46,000,000. It earned a total of  internationally.

References

External links
 
 
 
 
 
 

2014 drama films
2014 films
Chinese drama films
Films directed by Zhang Yimou
Films based on Chinese novels
Films about the Cultural Revolution
Films shot in Beijing
Films shot in Tianjin
Chinese independent films
IMAX films
Le Vision Pictures films
Sony Pictures Classics films
Films with screenplays by Zou Jingzhi
2014 independent films
2010s Mandarin-language films